Chartar is a town de facto in the Martuni Province of the breakaway Republic of Artsakh, de jure in the Khojavend District of Azerbaijan, in the disputed region of Nagorno-Karabakh. The town has an ethnic Armenian-majority population, and also had an Armenian majority in 1989.

History 

The town of Chartar was created out of a merger of the four villages of Ghuze Chartar, Ghuze Kaler, Gyune Chartar and Gyune Kaler.

During the Soviet period, the town was a part of the Martuni District of the Nagorno-Karabakh Autonomous Oblast.

Historical and cultural heritage 
Historical heritage sites in and around Chartar include Chartar Fortress (from between the 3rd and 1st centuries BCE), the Kohak Church (from between the 10th and 13th centuries), the St. Yeghishe Church from 1655, the church of Surb Amenaprkich founded in 1787, and the 19th-century 
St. George's Church. The St. Vardanank Church was consecrated in 2018 in Chartar.

Economy and culture 
The population is mainly engaged in agriculture and animal husbandry. As of 2015, the village has a municipal building, a house of culture, five schools, an art school, two kindergartens, nine shops, a hospital, and a medical centre.

Demographics 
Chartar had 3,951 inhabitants in 2005 (with the census divided between "Chartar" with 2,213 inhabitants and "Ghuze Chartar" with 1,738 inhabitants), and 4,100 inhabitants in 2015.

Gallery

References

External links 

 

Populated places in Martuni Province
Populated places in Khojavend District
Cities and towns in the Republic of Artsakh